Santa Rita is a corregimiento in La Chorrera District, Panamá Oeste Province, Panama with a population of 1,848 as of 2010. Its population as of 1990 was 1,191; its population as of 2000 was 1,307.

References

Corregimientos of Panamá Oeste Province